Nation Europa (also called Nation und Europa) was a far-right monthly magazine, published in Germany. It was founded in 1951 and was based in Coburg until its closure in 2009. It is also the name of the publishing house that developed the magazine, Nation Europa Verlag.

History
Founded by former SS commander Arthur Ehrhardt and Herbert Boehme, the publication took its title from a phrase sometimes used by Oswald Mosley to describe his Europe a Nation vision. Adopting a European-wide vision, writers such as Gaston-Armand Amaudruz and Maurice Bardèche were closely associated with the publication. Initially its largest single shareholder was Swedish neo-Nazi and former Olympic athlete Carl-Ehrenfried Carlberg. It was edited by Ehrhardt in association with a board of five made up of Per Engdahl, Hans Oehler, Paul van Tienen, Erik Lærum and Erich Kern.

Assessment
In 1955, the journal was classified as neo-Nazi by the Institute of Contemporary History (Munich). As late as 1989, the political scientist Eckhard Jesse described the magazine as the most important right-wing extremist (far-right) publication since 1951. , researcher at the  State Office for the Protection of the Constitution of North Rhine-Westphalia places Nation Europa on the spectrum of the German New Right. He notes that the publication, due to its age, held far-right positions before the emergence of the New Right: the magazine "opened up early to new right-wing extremist ideology variants, instead of simply returning to Nazism." Pfeiffer characterizes Nation Europa as a "decisive forerunner and pioneer of the New Right", which is "one of the ideas generators of German right-wing extremism". However, he notes that the intellectual level of the magazine steadily declined over the years.

In later years the publication became more closely associated with Deutsche Liga für Volk und Heimat. It was accused of giving space to Nazism and was investigated by the German government to this end. It was also associated with Holocaust denial and praised Mahmoud Ahmadinejad when he announced a conference on the topic. The magazine was renamed Nation und Europa in 1990. In 2000 Nation und Europa was merged with 'Lesen und Schenken'. They later publish a new journal of current affairs, Zuerst!, with Nation und Europa closed in 2009.

Notable authors

 Gaston-Armand Amaudruz
 Safet Babic
 Alain de Benoist
 Yvan Blot
 Michael Brückner
 Felix Buck 
 Björn Clemens
 Günter Deckert
 Ferdinand Ďurčanský
 Henning Eichberg
 Per Engdahl
 Julius Evola
 Johanna Grund
 Jürgen Hatzenbichler
 Fritz Hippler
 Erwin Guido Kolbenheyer
 Gerhard Krüger
 Jean-Marie Le Pen
 Bruno Mégret
 Armin Mohler
 Andreas Molau
 Andreas Mölzer
 Oswald Mosley
 Werner Naumann
 Harald Neubauer
 Michael Nier
 Hans Oehler
 Wilfred von Oven
 Oswald Pirow
 Karl-Heinz Priester
 Karl Richter
 Emil Schlee
 Franz Schönhuber
 Jürgen Schwab
 Alexander Raven Thomson
 Anton Vergeiner
 Reinhard Uhle-Wettler
 Georg Franz-Willing
 Gottlob Berger

See also
List of magazines in Germany

References

External links
Germany's New Nazis 1951 pamphlet about Nation Europa and other neo--nazi groups

1951 establishments in West Germany
2009 disestablishments in Germany
Defunct political magazines published in Germany
German-language magazines
Magazines established in 1951
Magazines disestablished in 2009
Mass media in Coburg
Neo-Nazi publications
Far-right politics in Germany